Grewia milleri is a species of flowering plant in the Malvaceae sensu lato or Tiliaceae or Sparrmanniaceae family.
It is found only in Yemen.
Its natural habitat is rocky areas.

Sources

milleri
Endemic flora of Socotra
Vulnerable plants
Taxonomy articles created by Polbot